Roshan Ravindra Karunachandra (Sinhala: රොෂාන් රවින්ද්‍ර) is an actor in Sri Lankan cinema, theater and television as well as a director, Makeup Artist, Assistant Director and Producer. One of the best dramatic actors in Sinhala drama, Ravindra is a recipient of Best Actor Award in many local award festivals in multiple times.

Personal life
Ravindra first studied at Rukmalgama School, then at Wawela Rajasinghe School and then entered Piliyandala Central High School. Then he initially worked in the hotel industry and later got the opportunity to join with the veterans Priyantha Sirikumara and Samarasiri Kandanage.

Ravindra is married to Sanjeewani, The couple has 3 children: Neththru, (son born in 2006), Kethaki (daughter born in 2008), and Thiru (son born in 2020). He is a disciple of Sri Lankan actor Mahendra Perera.

Career
While working in the hotel industry, Ravindra went to several acting schools and studied two years diploma in youth service council. He also participated in the workshops of drama experts like Somalatha Subasinghe, and Anoja Weerasinghe. Before acting, Ravindra worked as a make-up artist in some films such as Sudu Kalu Saha Alu. His most popular television acting was as the title role in Uthuwan Kande Sura Saradiyal and in Sahodaraya.  His first project as a television producer was the teledrama Rasthiyadukaraya, directed by Lakmini Amaradewa, followed by Kadadora directed by Rajiv Ananda.

In 2020, he directed his maiden television serial, Thanamalvila Kollek. In 2021, he won the Best Actor award at the Sumathi Awards for his performance in the teledrama Veeraya Gedara Awith.

Selected television serials

 Aebarthu Aetha 
 Ahasin Watuna  
 Amuthu Minissu
 Badde Kulawamiya
 Binari 
 Daskon
 Dedunnen Eha
 Degammediyawa 
 Eelangata Mokada Wenne
 Fantasy Avenue
 Golu Thaththa
 Hiru Avarata
 Hopalu Arana
 Idorayaka Mal Pipila
 Ikibindina Tharuka
 Ilandari Handawa
 Kaala Nadee Gala Basi 
 Kadadora
 Kaneru
 Manik Maliga
 Mage Kaviya Mata Denna 
 Nidi Kumari
 Nopenena Ananthaya
 Parasathu Mal
 Pulina Prasada 
 Ran Hiru Res
 Rasthiyadukaraya
 Rathriya Manaram
 Sahodaraya
 Samanalayano
 Samanalunta Wedithiyanna 
 Sanda Ginigath Rathriya 
 Sathya
 Sinansenna Anuththara 
 Thaara
 Thaaththe Api Awa
 Thunmanthanna
 Uthuwan Kande Sura Saradiyal
 Vishmaya 
 Warna
 Wasuli Kanda
 Weeraya Gedara Awith

Stage Dramas
 Mister President

Filmography
Ravindra's first major role in a film was Kasun in the 2004 film Aadaraneeya Wassaanaya, directed by Senesh Dissanaike Bandara.

Awards and accolades
Ravindra has won several awards at local stage drama festivals and television festivals for dramatic roles.

Derana Film Awards

|-
|| 2016 ||| Address Na || Best Supporting Actor || 
|}

Hiru Golden Film Awards

|-
|| 2017 ||| Sulanga Gini Aran || Best Supporting Actor || 
|}

Sarasaviya Awards

|-
|| 2017 ||| Sulanga Gini Aran || Best Supporting Actor || 
|}

Presidential Awards

|-
|| 2004 ||| Adaraneeya Wassanaya || Best Upcoming Actor || 
|-
|| 2017 ||| Sulanga Gini Aran || Best Supporting Actor || 
|-
|}

Signis Awards

|-
|| 2008 ||| Uthpalawanna || Exceptional Talent || 
|-
|| 2018 ||| Badde Kulawamiya || Best Actor || 
|-
|| 2019 ||| Ilandari Handaawa / Sahodaraya || Best Actor || 
|-
|| 2020 ||| Thanamalwila Kollek || Best Director || 
|-
|| 2021 ||| Weeraya Gedara Awith || Best Actor || 
|}

Sumathi Awards

|-
|| 2006 ||| Idorayaka Mal Pipila || Best Upcoming Actor || 
|-
|| 2011 ||| Abarthu Atha || Best Actor || 
|-
|| 2012 ||| Ahasin Watuna || Best Actor || 
|-
|| 2012 ||| Mage Kaviya Mata Denna || Best Supporting Actor || 
|-
|| 2015 ||| Jeewithayaka Kedapathak || Best Single Episode || 
|-
|| 2016 ||| Daskon || Best Actor || 
|-
|| 2019 ||| Sahodaraya || Best Actor || 
|-
|| 2021 ||| Weeraya Gedara Awith || Best Actor || 
|-
|| 2023||| Sathya || Best Actor || 
|-
|| 2023 ||| Thanamalwila Kollek || Best Teledrama Director ||

Raigam Tele'es

|-
|| 2010 ||| Abarthu Atha || Best Actor || 
|-
|| 2012 ||| Kadadora || Best Actor || 
|-
|| 2013 ||| Hopalu Arana || Best Actor || 
|-
|| 2016 ||| Daskon || Best Actor || 
|-
|| 2017 ||| Badde Kulawamiya || Best Actor || 
|-
|| 2018 ||| Sahodaraya || Best Actor || 
|-
|| 2019 ||| Weeraya Gedara Awith || Best Actor || 
|-
|| 2020 ||| Sathya || Best Actor || 
|-
|| 2020 ||| Thanamalvila Kollek || Best Director ||

State Television Awards

|-
|| 2014 ||| Thaaththe Api Awa || Best Supporting Actor || 
|-
|| 2015 ||| Daskon || Best Actor || 
|-
|| 2020 ||| Weeraya Gedara Awith || Best Actor || 
|-

References

External links
 

Sinhalese male actors
Sri Lankan male film actors
Sri Lankan male television actors
Living people
1978 births